The Hines Round Barn in Sallisaw, Oklahoma, also known as Williams Barn, is a round barn that was built in 1913 for W.R. Hines.  It was listed on the National Register of Historic Places in 1984.

It is approximately round, but in fact is multi-sided, having 20 approximately  straight wall sections. Its roof was supported in the center by a circular scaffolding inside the barn.

References

Barns on the National Register of Historic Places in Oklahoma
Buildings and structures completed in 1913
Buildings and structures in Sequoyah County, Oklahoma
Round barns in Oklahoma
1913 establishments in Oklahoma
National Register of Historic Places in Sequoyah County, Oklahoma